The 1978 California Attorney General election was held on November 7, 1978. Republican nominee George Deukmejian defeated Democratic nominee Yvonne Brathwaite Burke with 52.88% of the vote.

Primary elections
Primary elections were held on June 6, 1978.

Democratic primary

Candidates
Yvonne Brathwaite Burke, U.S. Representative
Burt Pines, Los Angeles City Attorney

Results

Republican primary

Candidates
George Deukmejian, State Senator
James L. Browning Jr., former United States Attorney for the Northern District of California

Results

General election

Candidates
Major party candidates
George Deukmejian, Republican
Yvonne Brathwaite Burke, Democratic

Other candidate's
Dallas Wendell Reid, American Independent
Robert J. Evans, Peace and Freedom

Results

References

1978
Attorney General
1978 United States Attorney General elections